EOE may refer to:

 Encyclopedia of Earth, an electronic reference work
 EOE: Eve of Extinction, a video game
The End of Evangelion, an anime film

 Echoes of Eternity, an American metal band
 "Errors and omissions excepted", a legal phrase
 Eosinophilic esophagitis, an allergic inflammatory condition
 European Option Exchange, now part of Euronext Amsterdam
 Newberry County Airport (FAA location ID: EOE), in South Carolina, United States
 Equal opportunity employer

See also 
 East of Eden (disambiguation)